The Sahibi river, also called the Sabi River, is an ephemeral, rain-fed river flowing through Rajasthan, Haryana (where its canalised portion is called the "Outfall Drain No 8") and Delhi states in India. It drains into Yamuna in Delhi, where its channeled course is also called the Najafgarh drain, which also serves as Najafgarh drain bird sanctuary. Sahibi is a seasonal river which is 300 km long and flows from Aravalli hills in Rajasthan to Haryana, of which 100 km is in Haryana.

The current and paleochannels of Sahibi river have several important wetlands that lie in series, including the Masani barrage wetland, Matanhail forest, Chhuchhakwas-Godhari, Khaparwas Wildlife Sanctuary, Bhindawas Wildlife Sanctuary, Outfall Drain Number 6 (canalised portion in Haryana of Sahibii river), Outfall Drain Number 8 (canalised portion in Haryana of Dohan river which is a tributary of Sahibi river), Sarbashirpur, Sultanpur National Park, Basai Wetland, Najafgarh lake and Najafgarh drain bird sanctuary, and The Lost lake of Gurugram, all of which are home to endangered and migratory birds, yet largely remain unprotected under extreme threat from the colonisers and builders.

Several Ochre Coloured Pottery culture sites (also identified as late Harappan phase of Indus Valley civilisation culture) have been found along the banks of Sahibi river and its tributaries such as Krishnavati river, Dohan river (originates near Neem Ka Thana in Alwar district) and Sota River (merges with Sahibi river at Behror in Alwar district and its canalised portion in Haryana is called the "Outfall Drain No 6"). The drainage pattern for all these rivers is dendritic.

Geography
The Sahibi River originates from the eastern slopes of the Saiwar Protected Forest hills in Aravalli Range near Jitgarh and Manoharpur in Sikar district of Rajasthan state. After covering about 157 km distance in the Rajasthan state. After gathering volume from a hundred tributaries, the Sahibi River forms a broad stream around Alwar and Kotputli.

Tributaries 
These west to north-west flowing rivers originate from the western slopes of Aravalli range in Rajasthan, flow through semi-arid historical Shekhawati region, drain into southern Haryana.
 Sahibi River, originates near Manoharpur in Sikar district flows through Haryana, along with its following tributaries: 
 Dohan river (Kotkasim drain), tributary of Sahibi river, originates near Neem Ka Thana in Alwar district. 
 Sota River, tributary of Sahibi river, merges with Sahibi river at Behror in Alwar district.
 Krishnavati river, former tributary of Sahibi river, originates near Dariba copper mines in Rajsamand district of Rajasthan, flows through Patan in Dausa district and Mothooka in Alwar district, then disappears in Mahendragarh district in Haryana much before reaching Sahibi river.

Catchment area
The catchment area of the Sahibi River encompasses the following cities and towns: Sikar, Jaipur, and Alwar in northeastern Rajasthan state; Bawal, Rewari, Pataudi, and Jhajjar district in southern Haryana state; and Delhi state.

Rajasthan
Sahibi Basin falls in three Districts of Rajasthan namely: Alwar district (62.11%), Jaipur district (29.30%) and Sikar district (8.59%).

Mean Annual Rainfall in Sahibi Basin is 627.60 mm. Highest maximum temperature ranges from 45.45 to 45.99 °C with a mean value of 45.8 °C, while Lowest minimum temperature ranges from 1.64 to 3.14 °C with a mean value of 2.45 °C.

Haryana
It leaves Rajasthan state beyond Kotkasim in Alwar district near village Lalpur and covers a total distance of about 222 km up to Dhasa Bund.

It enters Haryana state at Jhabua, near the city of Rewari in Rewari district, after which it re-enters first Rajasthan state near Kotkasim, and then Haryana again near the village of Jarthal. During light monsoon rainfall, the river's flat and sandy bottom absorbs all rainwater. Masani barrage on the river lies near Dahuhera. During heavy rains, the river has defined course up to Pataudi railway station and branches off into two smaller streams to Jhajjar, finally reaching the outskirts of Delhi through Najafgarh drain and ending at the Yamuna River.

Delhi

The Najafgarh Drain or Najafgarh Nallah (nullah in Hindi means drain) is another name for the Sahibi River, which continues its flow through Delhi where it is channelised for flood control purposes. It is a tributary to the Yamuna River, into which it flows. The Najafgarh Drain gets its name from the once famous and huge Najafgarh Lake near the town of Najafgarh in southwest Delhi. The Najafgarh Drain is the capital's most polluted body of water due to the direct inflow of untreated sewage from surrounding populated areas. Assessing the water quality of wetlands in wildlife habitats, a January 2005 report by the Central Pollution Control Board rated the Najafgarh Drain under category D, along with 13 other highly polluted wetlands.

Regulators at the Keshopur Bus Depot on the Outer Ring Road are wide with thick and high embankments. A vast amount of water is retained in this widened drain by closing the Kakrola regulators under Najafgarh Road to recharge the local groundwater table.

Barrages and bridges
Several bridges cross the Sahibi River. A bridge on State Highway 14 crosses the river between Behror and Sodawas (Behror to Alwar Road). On State Highway 52, a bridge crosses the river between Ajaraka and Dadhiya. The Masani barrage is also used as the bridge on NH 919 which merges with NH 48 (Delhi-Jaipur-Mumbai, formerly NH 8) at this barrage near Dharuhera, Rewari. Railway bridges between Ajaraka and Bawal and near Pataudi also cross the river. A railway bridge near Nangal Pathani also crosses the river.

History
Prior to 1960, the rain-fed Sahibi River entered Delhi near Dhansa and spilled its overflow in the Najafgarh Lake (Jheel) basin, creating a seasonal lake. In the following decades, the Sahibi River flow reaching Dhansa was channelised by digging a wide drain and connecting it directly to the Yamuna River, completely draining the seasonal Najafgarh Jheel.

The Sahibi River flooded in 1977. In response, the Masani barrage was constructed on Delhi-Jaipur highway near Masani village, Rewari. Several smaller dams have also been constructed throughout the hills of Rajasthan to store rainwater. The construction of dams has restricted the flow of water on the Sahibi River and it is now rare for water overflow from monsoon rains to reach up the Masani Barrage.

Archaeological sites in the area

Parts of Rajasthan and Haryana that Sahibi river flows through are arid and have only seasonal monsoon rainfall, in the past river might have held perennial flow as evident by the presence of several sites of the Ganeshwar–Jodhpura culture on the banks of present-day Sahibi River meanders and its tributaries. Among the finds are handmade and wheel-made pottery dated to 3309–2709 BCE and 2879–2384 BCE found on the banks of the Sahibi River at Jodhpura.

Other findings include pottery found on the Sahibi riverbed at Hansaka in the Rewari district by INTACH-Rewari.

A red stone statue of Vamana Dev, now displayed at the Shri Krishna Museum, Kurukshetra was unearthed in 2002 on the Sahibi riverbed near Bawal.

In various other places on Sahibi riverbed, many artifacts have been found, including arrowheads, fishhooks, spearheads, awls, and chisels.

Identification with Vedic rivers 

Several modern scholars identify the old Ghaggar-Hakra River (of which Tangri river is a tributary) as the Sarasvati river and the Sahibi River with the Drishadvati river of Vedic period, on the banks of which in the Vedic state of Brahmavarta, Indus-Sarasvati civilisation or Vedic Sanskriti developed. Such scholars include Bhargava The Drishadwati River had formed one border of the Vedic state of Brahmavarta while other was Saraswati river. This is mentioned in the Rigveda, the Manusmriti, and the other Hindu texts as well.

Ecology
This is an important part of ecological corridor along the route of Sahibi river which traverses from Aravalli hills in Rajasthan to Yamuna via Masani barrage, Matanhail forest, Chhuchhakwas-Godhari, Khaparwas Wildlife Sanctuary, Bhindawas Wildlife Sanctuary, Outfall Drain Number 8 and 6, Sarbashirpur, Sultanpur National Park, Basai and The Lost Lake (Gurugram). It lies 5 km northwest of Bhindawas Bird Sancturay and 46 km northwest of Sultantpur National Park via road.

Ecological concerns
Entire 100 km stretch of Sahibi river and its streams (Sota river, Kotkasim drain and Indori river) in Haryana are ecologically dead. Gurugram also dumps polluted discharge in the riverbed of Sahibi. In some of its reaches, from Mandawar and Kotkasim to Haryana border, meandering of the river causes bank erosion.

Restoration
Government of Haryana is coordinating with Government of Rajasthan to ensure water reaches usually-dry Masani barrage and dying seasonal Sahibi river. Another government project is being implemented to direct the extra water of Yamuna river during monsoon to Masani barrage through Jawahar Lal Nehru Canal and Western Yamuna Canal (c. July 2015).

See also 

 Saraswati river
 Dangri, a tributary of Sarsuti 
 Tangri river, a tributary of Sarsuti, merge if Dangri and Tangri are same 
 Sarsuti, a tributary of Ghaggar-Hakra River 
 Kaushalya river, a tributary of Ghaggar-Hakra River
 Chautang, a tributary of Ghaggar-Hakra River
 Sutlej, a tributary of Indus
 Ganges
 Indus
 Western Yamuna Canal, branches off Yamuna
 List of rivers of Rajasthan
 List of rivers of India
 List of dams and reservoirs in India

References

External links 

Sarasvati-Sindhu civilization and Sarasvati River
The Saraswati: Where lies the mystery by Saswati Paik

Rivers of Haryana
Rivers of Rajasthan
Rivers of Delhi
Tributaries of the Yamuna River
Yamuna River
Drainage canals
Canals in India
Archaeological sites in Haryana
Archaeological sites in Rajasthan
Indus basin
Indus Valley civilisation sites
Rigvedic rivers
Rivers of India